The Men's 50m butterfly event at the 2010 South American Games was held on March 26, with the heats at 10:00 and the Final at 18:00.

Medalists

Records

Results

Heats

Final

References
Heats
Final

Butterfly 50m M
Men's 50 metre butterfly